A partial lunar eclipse took place on Saturday, February 20, 1943. The Moon was strikingly shadowed in this deep partial eclipse which lasted 3 hours and 9 minutes, with 76% of the Moon in darkness at maximum.

Visibility

Related lunar eclipses

Saros series

See also 
List of lunar eclipses and List of 21st-century lunar eclipses

External links 
 Saros series 132
 

1943-02
1943 in science